Josef Wagner (April 24, 1916 in Zurich — September 25, 2003 in Bad Ragaz) was a Swiss cyclist.

Major results

1938
2nd Amateur World Road Championships
1941
1st  Overall Tour de Suisse
1943
2nd Tour du Lac Léman
1944
2nd National Road Race Championships
3rd Overall À travers Lausanne
1945
2nd National Road Race Championships
1946
2nd Overall Tour de Suisse
1st Stage 3b

References

1916 births
2003 deaths
Swiss male cyclists
Tour de Suisse stage winners
Cyclists from Zürich